The Japanese city pop band Omega Tribe underwent many changes throughout the band's lifetime, since the inception of Kyutipanchosu in 1978 to the most recent iteration W Omega In 2008. The band has changed names a total of four times with three offshoot bands. With name changes came member lineup changes as well.

Kyutipanchosu was founded as Masato Taguchi & Kyutipanchosu in 1978 and was composed of Kiyotaka Sugiyama, Masato Taguchi, Shinji Takashima, Kenji Yoshida, Keiichi Hiroishi, and Akira Senju. The band was shortened to Kyutipanchosu and came with the addition of Kumiko Nagasawa and Kimiko Mohri and the departure of Taguchi in 1980. That same year, Senju left the band while Takao Oshima and Toshitsugu Nishihara joined, with Nagasawa and Mohri leaving in 1981. The new six-piece band was renamed to Kiyotaka Sugiyama & Omega Tribe in 1983 after producer Koichi Fujita scouted them.

Due to tensions between the production team and the members, the band broke up in late 1985. In 1986, however, Takashima and Nishihara regrouped the band with a new vocalist, Carlos Toshiki, and a new guitarist, Mitsuya Kurokawa, being renamed to 1986 Omega Tribe. In 1988, Kurokawa left due to health issues, and months later, American vocalist Joey McCoy joined the band. The band was renamed to Carlos Toshiki & Omega Tribe, releasing material until 1991 when they broke up.

Nishihara and Takashima made two offshoot bands called DOME in 1992 and Weather Side in 1994 while the production team created Brand New Omega Tribe in 1993. Arai Masahito of Brand New Omega Tribe and Mitsuya Kurokawa made their own offshoot band in 2008 called W Omega.

Members

Lead vocalists

Backing vocalists

Guitar

Keyboards

Bass

Drums

Woodwinds and percussion

Timeline

Production team 
Some of the production team have also participated in the band's songs using their own instruments.

References 

Omega Tribe (Japanese band)